Haputale Urban Council (HUC) is the local authority for the town of Haputale in the Badulla District, Uva Province, Sri Lanka. The HUC is responsible for providing a variety of local public services including roads, sanitation, drains, housing, libraries, public parks and recreational facilities. It has 11 councillors elected using an open list proportional representation system.

Election results

2006 local government election
Results of the local government election held on 20 May 2006:

2011 local government election
Results of the local government election held on 17 March 2011:

2018 local government election
Results of the local government election held on 10 February 2018:

References

Government of Badulla District
Urban councils of Sri Lanka